Janjina is a village and a municipality located right in the center of the Pelješac peninsula, in the Dubrovnik-Neretva County, Croatia.

Village 

The village of Janjina includes a tiny fishing harbor and a hamlet called Zabreže (Behind the hill), the name describing its geographic situation. It is divided into five parts: Gornje Selo (The Upper Village) comprising Lovrovići, which together with Bara are known to exist from the 4th century AD. Jaspričići, Prišlići and Dežulovići seem to have been established between the 15th and 16th century.

The meaning of Janjina remains uncertain, but the local belief is that it derives from the female Christian name Janja, a Slavic form of the Hebrew Johanna. The oldest written records about Janjina date back from 1222 AD.

Municipality 

According to the 2001 census there were 593 people living in the municipality of Janjina, and the absolute majority are Croats (97.65%).

The villages and the respective populations are:
 Janjina, 256
 Sreser, 196
 Drače, 64
 Popova Luka, 40
 Osobjava, 37

The municipality was created in 1997, previously this area was part of the Ston municipality.

See also
Croatia
Dalmatia

External links

Municipality of Janjina, available in Croatian only

Populated places in Dubrovnik-Neretva County
Municipalities of Croatia